Ribáuè District is a district of Nampula Province in northeastern Mozambique. The principal town is 
Ribáuè.

Further reading
District profile (PDF) 

Districts in Nampula Province